Pichhaura is a village in Martinganj block, Azamgarh district, Uttar Pradesh, India.

Villages in Azamgarh district